The Onge are an indigenous ethnic group of the Andaman Islands, India.

Onge may also refer to:

 Onge language, their language
 Ong (surname) or Onge, an English surname

See also
 St. Onge (disambiguation) 
 Saintonge (disambiguation)